Textainer Group Holdings Limited is a holding company that focuses on purchasing, leasing, and resale of marine cargo containers.  The company was set up in 1979 by Filippo Tessari, and is based in Hamilton, Bermuda.   There are three business segments: Container Ownership, Container Management, and Container Resale. As of January 22, 2014, the company was the lessor of about two million intermodal containers. The company leases containers to more than 400 shipping lines and other lessees. In October 2012, it acquired about 81,000 twenty-foot equivalent units (TEUs) of dry freight containers from managed fleet. In December 2012, the company acquired a 50.1% interest in TAP Funding Ltd. In January 2013, the company acquired about 24,000 twenty-foot equivalent units of standard dry freight containers from its managed fleet. The company owns two subsidiaries, Textainer Equipment Management Limited (TEML) and Textainer Limited (TL). TL owns two subsidiaries, Textainer Marine Containers Limited (TMCL) and TW Container Leasing Ltd. (owned by TL and Wells Fargo Container Corp..

Operations 
Textainer operates in 14 regional and area offices: Americas Region in Hackensack, New Jersey; European Region in London; North Asia Region in Yokohama; and the South Asia Region in Singapore. The company has more than 400 leasing customers and more than 1,100 container sales customers.
In January 2014, Textainer Group Holdings Limited completed the acquisition of about 30,000 TEU of standard dry freight containers from its managed fleet ($35 million), which increased the percentage of Textainer’s owned fleet to 77%.
In December, 2013, the company announced their fleet surpassed 3 million TEU, which represented a major milestone for the company as well as the industry.
In December, 2012, Textainer acquired a 50.1% interest in TAP Funding Ltd. for about $78 million, with many types of container (dry freight, refrigerated).
In May 2011, Textainer acquired about 171,000 TEU of containers and related lease rights and working capital ($174 million) that it has been managing for Buss Global since 2006.
In October 2009, Textainer acquired 31,000 containers (53,000 TEU) of Amphibious Container Leasing Limited (Amficon), mostly speciality containers.

Products and services
The Container Ownership segment owns and leases dry freight containers (also dry freight specials). The Container Management segment offers acquisition and management services. The Container Resale segment sells containers from its fleet (also purchasing, leasing, or reselling containers). The company also provides leased containers under a contract with the Surface Deployment and Distribution Command for the US military.

See also
Seaco
List of largest container shipping companies

References

External links 
 

Companies listed on the New York Stock Exchange
Holding companies established in 1979
Container shipping companies
Business services companies established in 1979
1979 establishments in Bermuda
Companies of Bermuda
1979 establishments in North America